Guillaume-Désiré-Joseph Descamps (1779–1858), a French painter and engraver, was born at Lille. He was a pupil of François-André Vincent, but, obtaining the
"prix de Rome," he improved himself by travelling in Italy, and became court-painter of Murat in Naples. He died in Paris in 1858. The following paintings were executed by him:

The Women of Sparta (in the Lille Museum). 1808.
The Martyrdom of St. Andrew (in St. Andrė, Lille).
Murat on board the Ceres distributing Rewards (engraved hy himself).
The Conversion of St. Augustine (in St. Eustache, Paris).
The Apotheosis of Cardinal Tommasi (in San Martino di Monti, Rome).
The Neapolitan Troops marching out against Capri.

As an engraver he also produced six plates from the 'Fable of Psyche.'

References
 

1779 births
1858 deaths
18th-century engravers
19th-century engravers
18th-century French painters
French male painters
19th-century French painters
French engravers
Court painters
Prix de Rome for painting
Artists from Lille
19th-century French male artists
18th-century French male artists